The Vacant Era Film Festival is a film festival that takes place annually in the state of Oklahoma, in the United States. The first Vacant Era Film Festival was held in the historic downtown area of Norman, Oklahoma at The Sooner Theatre on Oct 2–5, 2008. The Vacant Era Film Festival showcases independent films from all over the United States and internationally, while aggressively promoting filmmaking in Oklahoma. The 2008 Vacant Era Film Festival showcased more films created by Oklahoma filmmakers, than any other film festival to date.

References 
2008 Vacant Era Film Festival
OU Daily
NewsOK
News9
The Norman Transcript
Oklahoma Gazette
Trading Markets

External links 
Official Website
Vacant Era Film Festival Myspace

Film festivals established in 2008
Film festivals in Oklahoma